Olusegun Awolowo Jr. (born 27 September 1963), is a Nigerian lawyer, he was the executive director of Nigerian Export Promotion Council, from 2013 to 2021. He is the grandson of former Nigerian nationalist, socialist and statesman, Chief Obafemi Awolowo. In July 2021, he was unanimously elected as the President of National Trade Promotion Organizations (TPOs) from ECOWAS member States.

Early life
Awolowo was born on 27 September 1963, his father (Segun Awolowo Sr.) died in 1963 at age 25 by car accident at the old Ibadan-Lagos road.  He was born two months after his father's death, he attended primary school in custody of his aunt, Mrs Tola Oyediran (nee Awolowo) and her husband Prof. Kayode Oyediran. Before then, he lived with his mother alongside his other siblings.

Education
Awolowo started his education at the Mayhill Convent School alongside Dolapo Osinbajo, wife of Vice President Yemi Osinbajo, all in the custody of Prof and Mrs Oyediran. From there, he proceeded to Igbobi College, Yaba, Lagos State for his secondary school education and completed his secondary school education at Government College, Ibadan. On completion of his secondary school education, he proceeded to the Ogun State University (now Olabisi Onabanjo University), Ago Iwoye and graduated with a LLB degree.

Career
Awolowo worked with the law firm of Abayomi Sogbesan & Co. and also with the law firm of GOK Ajayi & Co. after his call to bar in December 1989. He served in President Olusegun Obasanjo's administration as a Special Assistant on Traditional Institutions, Legal Due Diligence and Legal Matters.
He was appointed by President Umaru Musa Yar'Adua as Special Assistant and worked with the Federal Capital Territory Administration (FCTA), Abuja as Secretary for Social Development and Secretary of Transport from 2007 to 2011. After the election of a new government in 2011, he went back to his law practice until in November 2013 when President Goodluck Jonathan appointed him as Executive Director/CEO of the Nigerian Export Promotion Council.
In July 2021, he was unanimously elected as the President of National Trade Promotion Organizations (TPOs) from ECOWAS member States.

NEPC
Awolowo was appointed the executive director of the Nigerian Export Promotion Council (NEPC) by President Goodluck Jonathan in 2013 and his tenure expired in November 2017 but he was reappointed as executive director and chief executive officer by President Muhammadu Buhari in February 2018 for another four year tenure.
In June 2019, the NEPC under his leadership planned a partnership with retail company, Shoprite for the latter to export Nigerian products to other African countries and beyond.

Zero Oil
Awolowo is driving the Zero Oil Plan, as an economic blueprint for Nigeria. It was launched in 2016. He has engaged to promote the plan with the private sector, relevant government institutions and international development partners and businesses. Zero Oil is a part of the Economic Recovery and Growth Plan (ERGP), a medium term plan developed by the Federal Ministry of Budget and National Planning. His Zero Oil plan is to increase the country's export by increasing production of home made goods, moving from the export of raw materials to value added products so as to increase the foreign exchange revenue, to promote the value of Nigerian made products and services abroad, and to create jobs. It aims at generating $30billion in foreign exchange earnings.

MOU between AFREXIM, NEPC and NEXIM
In 2018, he led NEPC signed a Memorandum of understanding worth $1 billion with AFREXIM Bank and Nigerian Export-Import Bank (NEXIM) at the maiden edition of Intra-African Trade Fair (IATF2018) in Cairo, Egypt; which in aimed at promoting trade among African countries.

Personal life
Awolowo is married with children. His daughter, Seun is a motivational speaker and runs an NGO called Teach-A-Girl Nigeria, which focuses on Girl Child education in Nigeria. She is also the founder of Leads Africa and 3D Living Moments.

References

Living people
1963 births
Olabisi Onabanjo University alumni
Igbobi College alumni
Awolowo family
Government College, Ibadan alumni
20th-century Nigerian lawyers
Yoruba legal professionals
21st-century Nigerian lawyers